Latin Quarter (French: Quartier Latin) is a 1939 French comedy film directed by Christian Chamborant, Pierre Colombier and Alexander Esway and starring Bernard Lancret, Jean Tissier, Blanchette Brunoy and Junie Astor.

Synopsis
A wealthy banker, bored with his life, heads to the Latin Quarter of Paris where he pretends to be a struggling artist. He falls in love with a student from the Sorbonne and moves into the same boarding house as her while continuing his pretence of poverty.

Cast

References

Bibliography 
 Phillips, Alastair. City of Darkness, City of Light: Émigré Filmmakers in Paris, 1929-1939. Amsterdam University Press, 2004.

External links 
 

1939 films
French comedy films
1939 comedy films
1930s French-language films
Films directed by Christian Chamborant
Films directed by Alexander Esway
Films directed by Pierre Colombier
Films set in Paris
Films about artists
1930s French films